The Infinity of Lists is a book by Umberto Eco on the topic of lists (2009) .  The title of the original Italian edition was La Vertigine della Lista (The Vertigo of Lists) (2009) . It was produced in collaboration with the Louvre.

The examples of lists in the work range from Hesiod's list of the progeny of gods to Rabelais' list of bottom wipes.

Reception
Financial Times writer Simon Schama described the book (in list form) as a delight: "profuse, plethoric, prolix, plentiful, playful, populous, picaresque, picturesque; copious, cornucopian, congested, clotted; incontinent, infested, infectious; omnivorous, orgiastic, odd; abundant, redundant; multifarious, multitudinous; glutted, gargantuan, inclusive, elusive, and...exhaustive."  However, Schama also described it as exasperating: "If its pleasures easily overwhelm its irritants, that's because the book has the charm of extreme greed."

See also
The Book of Lists
List of lists of lists

References

2009 essays
Bompiani books
Books by Umberto Eco
Italian essays